Jürgen Koppelin (born 14 September 1945) is a German politician (FDP) who was a member of the Bundestag, the German parliament, from 1990 to 2013.

Koppelin was born in Wesselburen. He has been a member of his party since 1962 and is a banker by profession. From 1965 to 1969 he served in the German Luftwaffe. He was Parliamentary Manager for the FDP parliamentary group and speaker for fiscal politics from 1998 to 2009. In addition, he was deputy chairman of the FDP parliamentary group from October 2009 to May 2011. Koppelin acted as chairman of his party in Schleswig-Holstein from 1993 to November 2011.

Sources 

Members of the Bundestag for Schleswig-Holstein
Living people
1945 births
People from Wesselburen
Members of the Bundestag 2009–2013
Members of the Bundestag 2005–2009
Members of the Bundestag 2002–2005
Members of the Bundestag 1998–2002
Members of the Bundestag 1994–1998
Members of the Bundestag 1990–1994
Members of the Bundestag for the Free Democratic Party (Germany)